Nativity of Saint John the Baptist Church may refer to:

Romania
Church of the Nativity of Saint John the Baptist (Arad, Romania)
Nativity of St. John the Baptist Church, Focșani
Nativity of St. John the Baptist Church, Piatra Neamț

Ukraine

Russia
Chesme Church
Ivanovsky Monastery, Pskov